Rabia ibn Nasr was a Yemeni king. He was one of the Tababi'ah kings but was from a Sabaean family, therefore, he was one of Adhaaf al-Tababi'ah.

Biography
According to al-Suhayli, al-Lakhmi and Ibn Ishaq his name is "Rabiah Ibn Nasr Ibn Abi Haritha Ibn ʽAmr Ibn ʽAmir". al-Syhili says that the genealogists of Yemen says his name is "Nasr Ibn Rabiah Ibn Nasr Ibn al-Harith Ibn Nimarah Bin Lakhm". Al-Zubayr ibn Bakkar says his name is "Nasr Ibn Rabiah Ibn Nasr Ibn Malik Ibn Shaʽwoth Ibn Malik Ibn Ajam Ibn ʽAmr Ibn Nimarah Ibn Lakhm".

His dream 

One night Rabiah had a dream that terrified him, he sent to all the soothsayers, magicians, drawers of omens from the flight of birds and astrologers to interpret his dream. He didn't tell them what was his dream saying that the person who will know the correct interpretation would be able to know the dream without recounting it. They couldn't tell him what was his dream so they advised him to call Shaq and Satih. Rabiah called Satih and Shaq. Satih arrived earlier than Shaq.

Shaq and Satih were two famously known priests. They were born on the same day when a priestess Tarifah Bint al-Khair al-Himyariah died. It is said that she spit in their mouths when they were born and that they inherited the kahina from her. She was the wife of Amr Muzaykiya. 

According to Arab historians' accounts, Satih had no bones in his body and his face was in his chest. His body inflates when he gets angry. According to Ibn Abbas, "Satih was created as a mass of flesh without any bones but his skull, neck, and hands; he could be rolled up from the feet to his collarbone like a garment, and could move nothing but his tongue". Shaq had half human body, he had one leg, one eye and one hand.

Rabiah asked Satih what was his dream, Satih said, "you dreamed that there was a skull that came out of the darkness to Tihamah and started to eat heads of people". Rabiah said, "you weren't mistaken, so what is the interpretation?", Satih said, "I swear by the serpent which is between the two al-Harahs, that the Habash will take your land from Abyn to Jurash. Rabiah replied, "By your father! 0 Satih, this is indeed
distressing and painful for us; but when will this take place-in
my own time, or subsequently?" Satih replied, "No, it will be after sixteen to seventeen years later." Rabiah asked, "Will they be in Yemen forever? or would their dominion cut shortly?" Satih replied, "it will cut shortly," Rabiah asked, "who will come after them." Satih replied, "a king known as Iram Bin Dhi Yazan he will come from Aden and expel all of them from Yemen." Rabiah asked, "will Iram's dominion be forever or will it cut shortly?" Satih replied, "it will cut shortly." Rabiah asked, "who will come after Iram?" Satih replied, "a prophet who will come and his dominion shall last until the end of time." Rabiah asked, "is there an end for time?." Satih replied, "Yes, the day when the first generation meet with the last generation. The righteous will have joyful on it but the evildoers shall be made wretched." Rabiah asked, "is what you are telling us true? Oh, Satih." Satih replied, "Yes, by the redness of the dying sun at evening-and the beginning of the darkness of night and the dawn when it is complete-what I have told you is undoubtedly true."

Shqiq came later and told Rabiah a similar interpretation. When Rabiah saw that both Shaqiq and Satih gave similar interpretation he sent his family to Iraq and wrote to a Persian king called Shabur Ibn Khurrazād on their behalf to allow them to settle in al-Ḥirah.

al-Numan Ibn al-Mundir was a descendant of Rabiah Ibn Nasr.

See also
Amr ibn Adi a descendant of Rabia Ibn Nasr
Abu Karib 
Hassan al-Himyari

Notes

References 

Monarchs of Yemen
Year of death unknown
Year of birth unknown
Middle Eastern kings
6th-century Arabs